Peter Isaacs (born 18 August 1968 in Kingston, Jamaica) is a former Jamaican soccer forward.

Youth
Isaacs grew up in Kingston and attended Wolmer's School, where he was spotted by scouts from Howard University who recruited him to play at the university.  He attended Howard from 1986 to 1989, playing on the men's soccer team.  In 1988, Howard went to the NCAA championship game only to fall to Indiana. In 1989, Isaacs capped his collegiate career by being named a first team All American and a finalist for the Hermann Trophy.

Professional
On 26 July 1990, the Dallas Sidekicks drafted Isaacs in the first round (seventh overall) of the Major Indoor Soccer League draft.  However, a month earlier, on 26 June 1990, the San Francisco Bay Blackhawks of the American Professional Soccer League (APSL) had signed Isaacs to a two-year contract. He remained with the team through the 1993 season, after which the team folded.  He then moved to Mexican Second Division club Irapuato for the 1993–1994 season.  In 1994, he was back in the U.S. playing with the Fort Lauderdale Strikers of APSL.  However, the Strikers folded at the end of the season.  In 1995, he played for the Tampa Bay Cyclones in the USISL. On 6 April 1995, Major League Soccer signed Isaacs and in January 1996, the Kansas City Wiz selected him in the second round (sixteenth overall) of the 1996 MLS Inaugural Player Draft.  However, Isaacs never played for the Wiz.  In 1998, he spent one season with the Miami Breakers.

International
Isaacs earned at least 15 caps with Jamaica national team, scoring four goals.

He now coaches middle school soccer and in his spare time writes articles, one which was published by the Sun Sentinel in 2009.

References

1968 births
Living people
All-American men's college soccer players
American Professional Soccer League players
Irapuato F.C. footballers
Expatriate footballers in Mexico
Expatriate soccer players in the United States
Howard Bison men's soccer players
Association football forwards
Fort Lauderdale Strikers (1988–1994) players
Howard University alumni
Jamaica international footballers
Jamaican expatriate footballers
Jamaican expatriate sportspeople in Mexico
Jamaican expatriate sportspeople in the United States
Jamaican footballers
Sportspeople from Kingston, Jamaica
San Francisco Bay Blackhawks players
Tampa Bay Cyclones players
USISL players